TOTN may refer to:

Talk of the Nation, an American talk radio program
All or Nothing (Fat Joe album), a 2005 album which had the working title Things of That Nature (T.O.T.N.)